Young Township, Pennsylvania, may refer to:
 Young Township, Indiana County, Pennsylvania
 Young Township, Jefferson County, Pennsylvania

Pennsylvania township disambiguation pages